Web Services Dynamic Discovery (WS-Discovery) is a technical specification that defines a multicast discovery protocol to locate services on a local network. As the name suggests, the actual communication between nodes is done using web services standards, notably SOAP-over-UDP.

Various components in Microsoft's Windows Vista operating system use WS-Discovery, e.g. "People near me". The component WSDMON in Windows 7 and later uses WS-Discovery to automatically discover WSD-enabled network printers, which show in Network in Windows Explorer, and can be installed by double-clicking on them. In Windows 8 or later installation is automatic. WS-Discovery is enabled by default in networked HP printers since 2008. WS-Discovery is an integral part of Windows Rally technologies and Devices Profile for Web Services.

The protocol was originally developed by BEA Systems, Canon, Intel, Microsoft, and WebMethods. On July 1, 2009 it was approved as a standard by OASIS.

See also

 Avahi
 Bonjour
 DHCP
 Jini
 List of Web service specifications
 LLMNR
 OSGi Alliance
 SSDP
 Universal Plug and Play (UPnP)
 Web Services Discovery
 Web Services for Devices
 Zero-configuration networking (Zeroconf)

References

External links
Where to find Web Services on the Web
WS-Discovery specification version 1.0 (2005/04)
WS-Discovery specification version 1.1 Draft (2008/09)
WS-Discovery specification version 1.1 Final (2009/01)

Windows communication and services
Web service specifications
Web services
XML-based standards